Sam, Sammy or Samuel Brooks may refer to:

Sportspeople
Sam Brooks (rugby league) (born 1993), Scottish rugby player
Sammy Brooks (footballer) (1890–1960), British footballer
Sam Brooks, a member of the Cambridge rowing crew in The Boat Race 2002
Sammy Brooks, freestyle and collegiate wrestler, represented the United States of America in Freestyle wrestling world cup 2019

Politicians
Samuel Brooks (politician) (1793–1849), American-born merchant and Canadian politician
Samuel Wood Brooks (1840–1915), Australian politician and missionary

Others
Sam Brooks (dramatist), New Zealand playwright and dramatist
Sammy Brooks (1891–1951), American film actor
Samuel Brooks (cotton manufacturer) (1793–1864), English cotton manufacturer and banker
Samuel Palmer Brooks (1863–1931), President of Baylor University
Sam Brooks, guitarist associated with Blind Willie Walker
 Samuel Hamilton Brooks, after whom the Memphis Brooks Museum of Art was named

See also
Samuel Brooks House (disambiguation)
Sammy Brookes, English footballer
Samuel Brooke (1575–1631), English playwright, chaplain and professor of divinity
Sambrook (disambiguation)